The weightlifting competition at the 1964 Summer Olympics in Tokyo consisted of seven weight classes, all for men only. It also counted as 1964 World Weightlifting Championships.

Medal summary

Medal table

See also
 World Weightlifting Championships

References

External links

 olympic.prv
 todor66
 

 
1964 Summer Olympics events
1964
1964
1964 in weightlifting
International weightlifting competitions hosted by Japan